Thomas Joseph Corcoran (born May 23, 1939) is an American former politician. He served four terms in Congress as a U.S. Representative from Illinois (1977–84). He is a Republican.

Biography
Corcoran was born in Ottawa, Illinois. He graduated from Marquette High School in Ottawa in 1957. He received a B.A. from the University of Notre Dame in 1961 and did graduate work at University of Illinois, the University of Chicago, and Northwestern University.

He served in the United States Army as an artillery officer from 1963–65 and was stationed in Germany. He then went into politics, serving in staff positions for the State of Illinois Office in Washington, D.C. from 1969–72 and for William Harris while Harris was President of the Illinois Senate. After serving as vice president of the Chicago-North Western Transportation Co. from 1974 to 1976, he was elected to Congress in 1976 and was re-elected three times.

In the 1984 United States Senate election, Corcoran opted to challenge incumbent Senator Charles Percy in the Republican primary as a conservative alternative to Percy's record as a moderate Republican. Percy defeated Corcoran in the primary election before losing to Democratic candidate Paul Simon in the general election. Corcoran was succeeded in Congress by State Senator John Grotberg. In 1985, Cocoran announced his intention to run for the United States Senate against Democratic incumbent Alan J. Dixon in the 1986 Senate election. However, after losing several political allies to Inland Steel Company executive George Ranney he dropped out of the primary election. State Representative Judy Koehler defeated Ranney in the Republican primary.

He was appointed to the Board of Directors of United States Synthetic Fuels Corporation in 1984 by President Ronald Reagan. His term was supposed to run through 1990, but the Corporation was abolished in 1985.

Evan Corcoran, known for being an attorney of Donald Trump, is Tom Corcoran's son.

References

1939 births
Living people
University of Notre Dame alumni
University of Illinois Urbana-Champaign alumni
University of Chicago faculty
Northwestern University faculty
People from Ottawa, Illinois
United States Army officers
Republican Party members of the United States House of Representatives from Illinois
Members of Congress who became lobbyists